Ljubav, navika, panika is a Serbian sitcom, originally broadcast from 6 February 2005 to 1 April 2007 on RTV Pink. in 2005, the series was named by Golden Rose of Montreux as one of the best sitcoms. It remains one of the most popular Serbian television series from the 2000s.

The lead roles were portrayed by some of Serbia's best comedians, Seka Sablić, Nikola Simić and Zijah Sokolović; and young actresses Marija Karan and Mirka Vasiljević. Karan was replaced by Borka Tomović in 2006. Supporting and guest roles include Nada Macanković, Ljiljana Stjepanović, Gorica Popović, Vesna Trivalić, etc. The sitcom was shot in Belgrade.

Plot 
After many years of marriage, Vera (Seka Sablić) and Mića (Nikola Simić) decide to divorce. But, neither Vera nor Mića want to leave the apartment, and their daughters, Maja (Marija Karan) and Janja (Mirka Vasiljević). So, they decided to divorce, but to remain living together.  Vera and Mića are still in love, but they don't want to admit it. They're happy making the other one jealous, or making some jokes to each other. Their fights and many other situations make this show very amusing.

Cast 
Seka Sablić as Vera Milićević
Nikola Simić as Mića Milićević
Mirka Vasiljević as Janja Milićević
Marija Karan as Maja Milićević (2005–2006)
Borka Tomović as Maja Milićević (2006–2007)
Zijah Sokolović as Mr Jovanović
Nada Macanković as Maca
Radovan Vujović as Siledžija
Ljiljana Stjepanović as Kića
Gorica Popović as Professor Alimpijević
Vesna Trivalić as Smiljka

Awards and nominations 
2006: Golden Rose of Montreux for the Best Actress - Mirka Vasiljević (Nominated)
2007: Niš Film Festival Screen Couple of the Year by Večernje novosti - Seka Sablić & Nikola Simić (Won)

External links 
 Official Website
 Ljubav, navika, panika at IMDb.

RTV Pink original programming
2005 Serbian television series debuts
2007 Serbian television series endings
2000s Serbian television series
Serbian comedy television series
Serbian-language television shows
Television shows set in Serbia
Television shows filmed in Serbia